Zangelanlu (also Romanized as Zangelānlū; also known as Zangalānli and Zānganānlī) is a village in Zangelanlu Rural District, Lotfabad District, Dargaz County, Razavi Khorasan Province, Iran. At the 2006 census, its population was 802, in 187 families.

References 

Populated places in Dargaz County